Alice's Adventures in Wonderland is a 1972 British musical film based on Lewis Carroll's 1865 novel of the same name and its 1871 sequel, Through the Looking-Glass, directed by Australian television producer-director William Sterling. It had a distinguished ensemble cast with a musical score by John Barry and lyrics by Don Black.

In 1973, the film won the BAFTA Film Award at the BAFTA Awards Ceremony for Best Cinematography, won by Geoffrey Unsworth, and Best Costume Design, won by Anthony Mendleson. Stuart Freeborn created make-up for the film based closely on the original John Tenniel drawings in the first edition of the novel.

Plot
Alice lives in England, when suddenly a white rabbit appears, Alice follows the rabbit and ends up getting swept away in a rabbit hole to a place called Wonderland. Alice finds a door and realizes it’s too small for her, She finds a bottle that says “Drink Me”. She drinks and changes to small size. The youngster Alice won’t be able without the key. Alice finds a cookie that reads “Eat Me”. As she eats it, she changes super big, and starts singing about how big she is and starts crying, she floods the room and changes into small size back. Alice finds curious little animals and people like the Cheshire Cat and the White Rabbit and more. Alice ends up at the rabbit’s house, She drinks a bottle for her size. Alice ends up being really big for the White Rabbit, Alice changes to normal amount, With the characters all mad, she joins a tea party, with characters named the Mad Hatter, Alice gets fed up with the people and returns home.

Cast

 Fiona Fullerton - Alice
 Hywel Bennett - Duckworth
 Michael Crawford - White Rabbit
 Robert Helpmann - Mad Hatter
 Michael Hordern - Mock Turtle
 Michael Jayston - Dodgson
 Davy Kaye - Mouse
 Roy Kinnear - Cheshire Cat
 Spike Milligan - Gryphon
 Dudley Moore - Dormouse
 Dennis Price - King of Hearts
 Ralph Richardson - Caterpillar
 Flora Robson - Queen of Hearts
 Peter Sellers - March Hare
 Rodney Bewes - Knave of Hearts
 Ray Brooks - 5 of Spades
 Richard Warwick - 7 of Spades
 Dennis Waterman - 2 of Spades
 Julian Chagrin - Bill the Lizard
 Peter Bull - Duchess
 Patsy Rowlands - Cook
 Freddie Earlle - Guinea Pig Pat
 Freddie and Frank Cox - Tweedledum and Tweedledee
 William Ellis - Dodo
 Mike Elles - Guinea Pig Two
 Peter O'Farrell - Fish Footman
 Ian Trigger - Frog Footman
 Victoria Shallard - Lorina
 Pippa Vickers - Edith
 Ray Edwards - Eagle
Stanley Bates - Monkey
 Melita Manger - Squirrel
 Angela Morgan - Lory
 June Kidd - Magpie
 Michael Reardon - Frog
 Brian Tipping - Duck

Production

Casting
It was originally intended to cast an actress who was close to the age of Alice in the original book. They began their search looking for girls who were between seven and ten years old. This concept was later scrapped when they realized that most girls of that age "lose their teeth, lisp a great deal, and have short attention spans."

When the decision was made to audition older actresses, the director, William Sterling, orchestrated a nationwide search across Great Britain for an unknown young actress to play the title role of Alice. Over 2,000 girls between the ages of thirteen to seventeen auditioned for this highly sought after role. This search had been considered to be one of the biggest in the UK since Franco Zeffirelli's search for the roles of Romeo and Juliet six years earlier.

Some actresses who auditioned for the role of Alice included Lynne Frederick, Rosalyn Landor, Karen Dotrice, Deborah Makepeace, and Chloe Franks. Landor, who had just turned thirteen at the time, impressed everyone at her audition and was asked back a few times, but the producers and director ultimately decided that she was too young. Frederick was nearly eighteen at the time of her audition, and after doing a few screen tests was deemed too sophisticated and mature for the part. Landor and Frederick were later cast in the Lionel Jeffries film The Amazing Mr. Blunden (1972), which came out the same year as Alice's Adventures in Wonderland (1972).

Fifteen year old Fiona Fullerton was ultimately cast as Alice. For the role of Alice, Fullerton had her long hip length brown hair dyed chestnut blonde. Fullerton would later star on stage in London's West End in the musicals Camelot and Nymph Errant, singing on both productions' cast recordings.

Possible Deleted Scenes
Two songs appear on the film's soundtrack but are not in the final cut of the film: "I've Never Been This Far Before" performed by Alice when she enters the garden outside the Queen of Heart's palace, and "The Moral Song" sung by the Duchess to Alice during the Croquet Game. A dialogue scene was filmed between Alice and the Cheshire Cat, with the latter perched in a tree. Although some stills survive, the footage itself was cut from the final print and may no longer exist.

Soundtrack
 The Duchess Is Waiting
 Lyrics by Don Black
 Music by John Barry
 Performed by Michael Crawford

 Curiouser And Curiouser
 Lyrics by Don Black
 Music by John Barry
 Performed by Fiona Fullerton

 You've Got To Know When To Stop
 Lyrics by Don Black
 Music by John Barry
 Performed by Davy Kaye

 The Royal Processions
 Music by John Barry

 The Last Word Is Mine
 Lyrics by Don Black
 Music by John Barry
 Performed by Michael Crawford and Fiona Fullerton

 Digging For Apples
 Lyrics by Don Black
 Music by John Barry
 Performed by Freddie Earlle

 There Goes Bill
 Lyrics by Don Black
 Music by John Barry
 Performed by Freddie Earlle and Mike Elles

 How Doth The Little Crocodile
 Lyrics by Don Black
 Music by John Barry
 Performed by Fiona Fullerton

 Dum And Dee Dance (Nursery Rhyme)
 Lyrics by Lewis Carroll and Don Black
 Music by John Barry
 Performed by Fiona Fullerton

 From The Queen, An Invitation for the Duchess To Play Croquet
 Lyrics by Don Black
 Music by John Barry
 Performed by Peter O'Farrell and Ian Trigger

 The Duchess's Lullaby
 Lyrics by Lewis Carroll and Don Black
 Music by John Barry
 Performed by Peter Bull and Patsy Rowlands

 It's More Like A Pig Than A Baby
 Lyrics by Don Black
 Music by John Barry
 Performed by Fiona Fullerton

 I See What I Eat
 Lyrics by Don Black
 Music by John Barry
 Performed by Robert Helpmann, Peter Sellers, Dudley Moore and Fiona Fullerton

 Twinkle, Twinkle, Little Bat
 Lyrics by Don Black
 Music by John Barry
 Performed by Robert Helpmann, Peter Sellers

 The Pun Song
 Lyrics by Don Black
 Music by John Barry
 Performed by Robert Helpmann, Peter Sellers, Dudley Moore and Fiona Fullerton

 Off With Their Heads
 Lyrics by Don Black
 Music by John Barry
 Performed by Flora Robson

 The Croquet Game
 Music by John Barry

 Off With Their Heads (Reprise)
 Lyrics by Don Black
 Music by John Barry
 Performed by Flora Robson

 I've Never Been This Far Before
 Lyrics by Don Black
 Music by John Barry
 Performed by Fiona Fullerton

 The Moral Song
 Lyrics by Lewis Carroll and Don Black
 Music by John Barry
 Performed by Peter Bull

 The Me I Never Knew
 Lyrics by Don Black
 Music by John Barry
 Performed by Fiona Fullerton

 The Lobster Quadrille (The Mock Turtle's Song)
 Music by John Barry

 Will You Walk A Little Faster, Said A Whiting to a Snail
 Lyrics by Lewis Carroll and Don Black
 Music by John Barry
 Performed by Michael Hordern and Spike Milligan

 They Told Me (Evidence Read at the Trial of the Knave of Hearts)
 Lyrics by Lewis Carroll and Don Black
 Music by John Barry
 Performed by Michael Crawford

Home media
The film has been released on VHS and DVD several times.

References

External links
 
 
 Miscellaneous sites for Alice's Adventures in Wonderland
 External reviews for Alice's Adventures in Wonderland

1970s fantasy films
1970s musical films
1972 films
British fantasy films
British musical films
British children's films
Films based on Alice in Wonderland
Films about size change
Films scored by John Barry (composer)
Films based on multiple works of a series
1970s children's films
1970s English-language films
Cultural depictions of Lewis Carroll
Films directed by William Sterling (director)
1970s British films